Michael Fitzgerald (born 7 October 1946) is an Irish professor of child and adolescent psychiatry, specialising in autism spectrum disorder (ASD). As of June 2005, he said he had diagnosed over 900 individuals with Asperger syndrome.

Career
His research is in the area of epidemiology of child and adolescent psychiatry. He has been involved in research collaboration in 18 countries and in initiating master's degree programs at Irish universities. He has lectured including in London, at the Royal Society, British Academy, and the British Library and also in New York City, Buenos Aires, Tbilisi, Melbourne and many European countries as well as in China, Malaysia, Korea, and Hawaii.
He was the overall winner of the “Excellence in Psychiatry” award 2017 and was nominated as one of the top 4 Psychiatrists by Hospital Professional News Ireland - Top 100 Professionals in Ireland 2017.

Autism
In 2004's Autism and Creativity: Is There a Link Between Autism in Men and Exceptional Ability?, Fitzgerald claims that Lewis Carroll, Éamon de Valera, Sir Keith Joseph, Ramanujan, Ludwig Wittgenstein and W.B. Yeats may have been autistic.

In 2005's The Genesis of Artistic Creativity: Asperger's Syndrome and the Arts, he claims that historical figures such as Hans Christian Andersen and George Orwell might have been autistic.

Selected publications

References

Academics of Trinity College Dublin
Asperger syndrome
Autism activists
Autism researchers
Child psychiatrists
Irish psychiatrists
Living people
Alumni of Trinity College Dublin
Academics of the University of Galway
1946 births